Spartan Keyes is a neighborhood of central San Jose, California, located just south of Downtown San Jose. Spartan Keyes is home to a notable community of artists, art studios, and galleries. The neighborhood is home to the south campus of San Jose State University and is one of central San Jose's historic neighborhoods, made up of late 19th and early 20th century architecture.

History

The neighborhood is made up of late 19th and early 20th century residences, former canneries and warehouses, and other noteworthy historic structures. The neighborhood is predominantly Chicano/Mexican-American.

Rail tracks were laid through the district in the late 1860s and the area came to house numerous canneries and processing companies supporting the Santa Clara Valley's burgeoning agricultural industry at the time. Local landmarks including the former American Can Company factory and the JTR Distributors warehouses were built to support these industries.

The Old Home of Benevolence, at the corner of 11th and Martha, was built by the Ladies' Benevolent Society in a Spanish Colonial Revival architecture in 1924.

Geography
Spartan Keyes is located south of Downtown San Jose and east of Washington-Guadalupe. The neighborhood's eastern border is made up of Coyote Creek and Kelley Park.

Arts
The area is notably home to a community of artists, art studios, and galleries. Many former warehouses and factories have been converted into art studios and galleries, such as Citadel Art Studios and Art Ark. The San José State University Foundry and its art program are also located in the area.

Landmarks

CEFCU Stadium, home of the San José State Spartans
Bestor Art Park
Old Home of Benevolence
Old American Can Company Factory
Santa Clara County Fairgrounds

References

External links

Neighborhoods in San Jose, California
Chicano and Mexican neighborhoods in California